Bowman is a city in Elbert County, Georgia, United States. As of the 2020 census, the city had a population of 872.

History
The Georgia General Assembly incorporated Bowman as a town in 1907. The community was named after Thomas J. Bowman, a railroad promoter.

Geography
Bowman is located in northwestern Elbert County at  (34.204231, -83.026989). State Routes 17 and 172 cross in the center of town. GA 17 leads northwest  to Royston and southeast  to Elberton, the Elbert County seat, while GA 172 leads northeast  to Hartwell and southwest  to Athens.

Demographics

As of the census of 2000, there were 898 people, 377 households, and 243 families residing in the city. The racial makeup of the city was 74.05% White, 24.28% African American, 0.67% from other races, and 1.00% from two or more races. Hispanic or Latino of any race were 1.22% of the population.

There were 377 households, out of which 26.5% had children under the age of 18 living with them, 45.1% were married couples living together, 15.9% had a female householder with no husband present, and 35.3% were non-families. 31.8% of all households were made up of individuals, and 12.2% had someone living alone who was 65 years of age or older.  The average household size was 2.38 and the average family size was 3.03.

In the city, the population was spread out, with 24.4% under the age of 18, 9.4% from 18 to 24, 26.9% from 25 to 44, 24.4% from 45 to 64, and 14.9% who were 65 years of age or older.  The median age was 38 years. For every 100 females, there were 88.7 males.  For every 100 females age 18 and over, there were 87.1 males.

The median income for a household in the city was $24,083, and the median income for a family was $33,542. Males had a median income of $30,714 versus $23,750 for females. The per capita income for the city was $14,584.  About 22.0% of families and 24.2% of the population were below the poverty line, including 30.2% of those under age 18 and 28.7% of those age 65 or over.

Government
The city of Bowman is governed by a mayor and five city council members who serve four-year terms.   Current council members include Wade Bridges, Rachel Felice, Mary Clark, Roberta Rice and Leona Brown. Bowman operates under a weak mayor style of government, meaning the mayor does not have a vote but is charged with facilitating the monthly meeting and acting on any matters passed by council.

References

External links
 Bowman Business and Community Association

Cities in Georgia (U.S. state)
Cities in Elbert County, Georgia